Albert Joseph Mantello (30 April 1934 – 26 September 2021) was a former Italian-Australian rules footballer who played for North Melbourne in the Victorian Football League (VFL).

A strongly built and physical footballer, Mantello usually played as either a half back flanker or centreman. He captained North Melbourne in 1960 and represented Victoria in an interstate match in 1961.

Albert Mantello was inducted into the North Melbourne Hall Of Fame in 2009 alongside club greats Denis Pagan and Wayne Carey.

References

External links

1934 births
2021 deaths
Australian people of Italian descent
Australian rules footballers from Victoria (Australia)
North Melbourne Football Club players
North Melbourne Football Club administrators